Tunnel motor may refer to:

 EMD SD40T-2 locomotive
 EMD SD45T-2 locomotive
 EMD GP15-1 locomotive
 EMD GP15T locomotive
 EMD GP15AC locomotive